Stone Flower is the sixth studio album by Antônio Carlos Jobim. Recorded in March, April, and May 1970 by Rudy Van Gelder at Van Gelder Studios and produced by Creed Taylor, the album was released on July 7 on CTI Records.

Track listing
All tracks composed by Antônio Carlos Jobim, except where noted.

 "Tereza My Love" – 4:24
 "Children's Games" – 3:30
 "Choro" – 2:10
 "Brazil" (Ary Barroso) – 7:25
 "Stone Flower" – 3:21
 "Amparo" – 3:41
 "Andorinha" – 3:32
 "God and the Devil in the Land of the Sun" – 2:23
 "Sabiá" – 3:58
 "Brazil" [alternate take] – 5:25

Track 10 only available on CD reissue.

Personnel
 Antônio Carlos Jobim – piano, electric piano, guitar, vocals (tracks 4,9,10)
 Harry Lookofsky – violin
 Joe Farrell – soprano saxophone
 Urbie Green – trombone
 Hubert Laws  – flute
 Ron Carter – double bass
 João Palma – drums
 Airto Moreira – percussion
 Everaldo Ferreira – percussion
 Eumir Deodato – guitar, arranger

Charts

References

1970 albums
Albums arranged by Eumir Deodato
Albums recorded at Van Gelder Studio
Albums produced by Creed Taylor
Antônio Carlos Jobim albums
CTI Records albums
Instrumental albums
Portuguese-language albums